Belvidere Center is an unincorporated village in the town of Belvidere, Lamoille County, Vermont, United States. Belvidere Center had a post office from July 21, 1887, until February 14, 2004; it still has its own ZIP code, 05442.

References

Unincorporated communities in Lamoille County, Vermont
Unincorporated communities in Vermont